Cereal bar may refer to:

Energy bar, which contains cereal and other ingredients
Flapjack (oat bar), also known as a muesli bar
Granola bar

Cereal bars